Sergey Aleksandrovich Sharikov (18 June 1974 – 6 June 2015), also known as Serguei/Sergei Charikov, was a left-handed Russian Olympic champion sabre fencer. In the Olympics he won two gold medals, a silver medal, and a bronze medal.

Early life
Sharikov was born in Moscow, Russia, and was Jewish.

Fencing career
One of the best sabre fencers in the world, Sharikov began fencing at the age of 12. He was a protege of sabre fencer David Tyshler. Sharikov was on the Russian national fencing team from 1994 to 2005.

World University Games
At the 1997 Summer Universiade and 1999 Summer Universiade, he won bronze medals at the World University Games in sabre.

In 2001, while ranked second in the world in sabre, he won the 21st World University Games sabre championship and was part of the Russian team that won the team gold (beating Hungary, 45–37).

European Championships
He won the 2000 European Fencing Championships, and came in second at the 2002 European Fencing Championships, and third at the 2004 European Fencing Championships. His team won the gold medal in 2000–02 and 2004.

World Championships and World Cup
In 1994, he won an individual gold medal at the Junior World Fencing Championships. In 1995, he won a team silver medal at the 1995 World Fencing Championships, and an individual silver medal at the Fencing World Cup.

He placed third in the individual sabre events at the 1998 World Fencing Championships and 2000 World Fencing Championships, and third in the team sabre event at the 1999 World Fencing Championships. His team won the gold medal in 2001–03.

Olympics
He competed in three Olympiads for Russia, winning 4 medals (through 2011, that was the most medals won by any fencer for Russia).

At the 1996 Atlanta Games, ranked as world # 4, he competed in both the individual and team events. In the team sabre competition, Sharikov and the Russians defeated Hungary in the final (45–25) to win the gold medal. In the individual competition, Sharikov easily advanced to the final before losing 15–12 to teammate Stanislav Pozdnyakov; he was awarded the silver medal.

Sharikov returned to the Olympics at the 2000 Sydney Games and helped lead the Russian team to its second consecutive gold medal in the team sabre event; they easily defeated France in the final, 45–32. In the individual sabre, Sharikov entered the Olympics as the # 3 seed (he was also ranked # 3 in the world), but was eliminated in the third round of the competition, 15–14.

Sharikov was seeded fourth in the individual sabre event in the 2004 Athens Games.  The Russian lost a close match, 13–15 in the quarterfinal, to Italian Aldo Montano, who went on to win the gold. In the team event, Russia lost its semifinal encounter with Italy 42–45, but Russia won the bronze medal match.

Maccabiah Games
Sharikov competed for the Russian team at the 2001 Maccabiah Games in Israel.  He won the gold medal in the individual sabre over fellow Olympian, Vadim Gutzeit of the Ukraine.

He also competed in the 2005 Maccabiah Games in Israel, this time winning the silver medal as Vadim Gutzeit beat him 15–13 for the gold medal.

Coaching and federation career
Sharikov coached the Russia fencing team at the 2001 Maccabiah Games. After finishing his competitive career, Sharikov was a member of the executive committee of the Russian Fencing Federation, and in 2009 he became head coach of the Russian national sabre reserve team.

Hall of Fame
Sharikov was inducted into the International Jewish Sports Hall of Fame in 2003 and 2005.

Death
Sharikov died in the evening of 6 June 2015 in an automobile accident at the age of 40. While on vacation, he was driving an all-terrain vehicle on the Kaluga-Tarusa-Serpukhov highway south-west of Moscow as a part of a group of ATV drivers when he lost control of his vehicle and it changed into the opposite traffic lane and collided head-on with a car driving in the opposite direction. The other car's driver was hospitalized. Sharikov was rushed to the Tarusa district central hospital, but died there from his injuries.

See also
 List of select Jewish fencers

References

External links

 
 
   (in English)
 
 
  
 Competition results at sportquick.com
 Bio at jewishvirtuallibrary.org
 Bio at jewsinsports.org
 
 Jewish Sports Review article 
 
 2004 Photo at taipeitimes.com 
 Photo at smh.com.au
 "An open letter from Sergei Sharikov, the double Olympic Champion, to the global fencing community." at fencing-future.com

1974 births
2015 deaths
Russian male sabre fencers
Russian fencing coaches
Olympic fencers of Russia
Olympic medalists in fencing
Olympic gold medalists for Russia
Olympic bronze medalists for Russia
Olympic silver medalists for Russia
Fencers at the 1996 Summer Olympics
Fencers at the 2000 Summer Olympics
Fencers at the 2004 Summer Olympics
Medalists at the 1996 Summer Olympics
Medalists at the 2000 Summer Olympics
Medalists at the 2004 Summer Olympics
Maccabiah Games medalists in fencing
Maccabiah Games gold medalists for Russia
Maccabiah Games silver medalists for Russia
Competitors at the 2001 Maccabiah Games
Competitors at the 2005 Maccabiah Games
Universiade bronze medalists for Russia
Universiade medalists in fencing
International Jewish Sports Hall of Fame inductees
Jewish Russian sportspeople
Jewish male sabre fencers
Road incident deaths in Russia
Martial artists from Moscow
Russian State University of Physical Education, Sport, Youth and Tourism alumni
Medalists at the 1997 Summer Universiade
Medalists at the 1999 Summer Universiade
Medalists at the 2001 Summer Universiade